MMU may refer to:

Science and technology
 Memory management unit, a computer component
 Manned Maneuvering Unit, a NASA spacesuit rocket pack
 
 Milli mass unit, an unofficial unit of mass
 Minimum Mapping Unit, a spatial measure used in remote sensing and cartography

Education
 Manchester Metropolitan University, in England
 Marymount University, in Arlington, Virginia
 Mount Mansfield Union High School, in Jericho, Vermont
 Mount Meru University, in Tanzania
 Mountains of the Moon University, in Fort Portal, Uganda
 Multimedia University, in Malaysia
 Myanmar Maritime University

Other
 Mobile Meteorological Unit, a deployable weather forecasting support unit of the British Armed Forces
 Monomethylurea, one of the ureas, used in synthetic medications
 Morristown Municipal Airport (IATA code MMU), in New Jersey
 Mega Man Universe, a game by Capcom